Selahattin Çolak is a politician from Turkey, and served as the mayor of Adana for two terms (1977–1980 and 1989–1994).

Career
He served at police services before politics. He was the security chief for Süleyman Demirel during the 1970s when Demirel was prime minister of Turkey.

Mayor of Adana
At the municipal elections on 11 December 1977, he was elected Mayor of Adana from Republican People's Party (CHP). On 12 September 1980, he was removed from office by coup d'état with all the other politicians in Turkey. On  26 March 1989 he was elected again as Mayor of Adana. He served in the post until 1994, and did not run again, when his party, CHP, did not choose him as their candidate.

References

Living people
Mayors of Adana
People from Adana
Republican People's Party (Turkey) politicians
Social Democratic People's Party (Turkey) politicians
Year of birth missing (living people)